BCM is part of Fareva,  a subcontractor in the industrial and household, cosmetics and pharmaceuticals fields.

BCM operates in Beeston, Nottinghamshire in the UK.

History
BCM (Boots Contract Manufacturing) originated as the in-house manufacturing arm of Boots The Chemist.
Boots expanded the BCM business into Vitre, France (BCMC - BCM Cosmétique) and Dietzenbach, Germany (BCMK - BCM Kosmetik) with each factory focusing on particular portfolios.
As well as manufacturing Boots' own brands of products, BCM would undertake contract manufacturing work for third party pharmaceutical and personal care companies.

In 2017 the now Global WBA (Walgreens Boots Alliance) sold its manufacturing plants to Fareva, a global contract manufacturing company.
WBA and Fareva entered into a 10-year partnership agreement, whereby Fareva would be WBA's partner of choice for product manufacturing.

Products
BCM manufactures consumer health and beauty products for Walgreens Boots Alliance and other famous brands, as well as special prescription medicines for individual use in the UK through BCM Specials

References

External links
 BCM Manufacturing
 FAREVA

1991 establishments in England
Manufacturing companies established in 1991
Household and personal product companies of the United Kingdom
Manufacturing companies based in Nottingham
Pharmaceutical companies of England